Koorete may refer to:
the Koorete people
the Koorete language